December 21, 2013 – January 6, 2014: 2013–14 College Bowls
 December 21, 2013: Famous Idaho Potato Bowl at Boise
 San Diego State defeated Buffalo 49–24.
 December 21, 2013: Las Vegas Bowl
 USC defeated Fresno State 45–20.
 December 21, 2013: New Mexico Bowl at Albuquerque
 Colorado State defeated Washington State 48–45.
 December 21, 2013: New Orleans Bowl
 LA-Lafayette defeated Tulane 24–21.
 December 23, 2013: Beef 'O' Brady's Bowl at St. Petersburg
 East Carolina defeated Ohio 37–20.
 December 24, 2013: Hawaii Bowl at Honolulu
 Oregon State defeated Boise State 38–23.
 December 26, 2013: Little Caesars Pizza Bowl at Detroit
 Pittsburgh defeated Bowling Green 30–27.
 December 26, 2013: Poinsettia Bowl at San Diego
 Utah State defeated Northern Illinois 21–14.
 December 27, 2013: Fight Hunger Bowl at San Francisco
 Washington defeated BYU 31–16.
 December 27, 2013: Military Bowl at Annapolis, Maryland
 Marshall defeated Maryland 31–20.
 December 27, 2013: Texas Bowl at Houston
 Syracuse defeated Minnesota 21–17.
 December 28, 2013: Belk Bowl at Charlotte, North Carolina
 North Carolina defeated Cincinnati 38–17.
 December 28, 2013: Buffalo Wild Wings Bowl at Tempe, Arizona
 Kansas State defeated Michigan 31–14.
 December 28, 2013: Pinstripe Bowl at The Bronx (New York City)
 Notre Dame defeated Rutgers 29–16.
 December 28, 2013: Russell Athletic Bowl at Orlando, Florida
 Louisville defeated Miami (FL) 36–9.
 December 30, 2013: Alamo Bowl at San Antonio
 Oregon defeated Texas 30–7.
 December 30, 2013: Armed Forces Bowl at Fort Worth, Texas
 Navy defeated Middle Tennessee 24–6.
 December 30, 2013: Holiday Bowl at San Diego
 Texas Tech defeated Arizona State 37–23.
 December 30, 2013: Music City Bowl at Nashville, Tennessee
 Ole Miss defeated Georgia Tech 25–17.
 December 31, 2013: AdvoCare V100 Bowl at Shreveport, Louisiana
 Arizona defeated Boston College 42–19.
 December 31, 2013: Chick-fil-A Bowl at Atlanta
 Texas A&M defeated Duke 52–48.
 December 31, 2013: Liberty Bowl at Memphis, Tennessee
 Mississippi State defeated Rice 44–7.
 December 31, 2013: Sun Bowl at El Paso, Texas
 UCLA defeated Virginia Tech 42–12.
 January 1, 2014: Capital One Bowl at Orlando, Florida
 South Carolina defeated Wisconsin 34–24.
 January 1, 2014: Fiesta Bowl at Glendale, Arizona
 UCF defeated Baylor 52–42.
 January 1, 2014: Gator Bowl at Jacksonville, Florida
 Nebraska defeated Georgia 24–19.
 January 1, 2014: Heart of Dallas Bowl
 North Texas defeated UNLV 36–14.
 January 1, 2014: Outback Bowl at Tampa, Florida
 LSU defeated Iowa 21–14.
 January 1, 2014: Rose Bowl Game at Pasadena, California
 Michigan State defeated Stanford 24–20.
 January 2, 2014: Sugar Bowl at New Orleans
 Oklahoma defeated Alabama 45–31.
 January 3, 2014: Cotton Bowl at Dallas
 Missouri defeated Oklahoma State 41–31.
 January 3, 2014: Orange Bowl at Miami Gardens, Florida
 Clemson defeated Ohio State 40–35.
 January 4, 2014: BBVA Compass Bowl at Birmingham, Alabama
 Vanderbilt defeated Houston 41–24.
 January 5, 2014: GoDaddy Bowl at Mobile, Alabama
 Arkansas State defeated Ball State 23–20.
 January 6, 2014: BCS National Championship Game at Pasadena, California
 #1 Florida State defeated #2 Auburn 34–31.
 January 26: 2014 Pro Bowl in Halawa, Hawaii (outside of Honolulu) at Aloha Stadium
 Team Rice defeated Team Sanders 22–21.
 February 2: The National Football League championship, Super Bowl XLVIII, at MetLife Stadium in East Rutherford, New Jersey
 Seattle Seahawks defeated the Denver Broncos 43–8, to claim its first title.
  defeated , 30–27, to claim its third title.  took the bronze medal.
 July 5 – 17: 2014 IFAF U-19 World Championship in Kuwait City
 The  defeated , 40–17, to claim its second IFAF junior title.  took the bronze medal.
 July 11 – 13: 2014 IFAF Europe Champions League Final Four in Élancourt
 Helsinki Roosters defeated SBB Vukovi Beograd, 36–29, to claim the debut ECL title.
 July 19: 2014 EFAF Eurobowl in Berlin
 Berlin Adler defeated fellow German team, the New Yorker Lions, 20–17, to claim its second Eurobowl title.
 September 4 – December 28: 2014 NFL season
 American Football Conference season winner: New England Patriots
 National Football Conference season winner: Seattle Seahawks
 September 10 – 12: 2014 IFAF Flag Football World Championship in Grosseto
 Note: This event was scheduled to take place in Jerusalem, from August 12 – 15. However, the 2014 Israel–Gaza conflict gave the IFAF the go-ahead to move the event from there to alternate host nation of Italy, on July 28, 2014.
 Men -> Champions: ; Second: ; Third: 
 Women -> Champions: ; Second: ; Third:

Pro Football Hall of Fame
Class of 2014:
Derrick Brooks, player
Ray Guy, player
Claude Humphrey, player
Walter Jones, player
Andre Reed, player
Michael Strahan, player
Aeneas Williams, player

References